Verplank is a surname. Notable people with the surname include:

Bill Verplank, American engineer and designer
Scott Verplank (born 1964), American golfer

See also
Verplanck (disambiguation)